Jeroen de Lange (born 7 November 1968, in Breda) is a former Dutch politician. Between 25 January 2012 and 19 September 2012, he served as a member of his country's  House of Representatives, representing the Labour Party (Partij van de Arbeid). He focused on matters of development aid and trade policy.

Formerly he worked at the World Bank.

Jeroen de Lange is married to journalist and television presenter Marcia Luyten.

References 
  Parlement.com biography

1968 births
Living people
Labour Party (Netherlands) politicians
Members of the House of Representatives (Netherlands)
People from Breda
World Bank people
21st-century Dutch politicians